The Sutla (Croatian) or Sotla (Slovene) is a river flowing through Slovenia and Croatia, mostly forming their border. It is a tributary to the Sava, itself a tributary to the Danube.

Overview
The Sutla flows through the following municipalities:
in Slovenia: Rogatec, Rogaška Slatina, Podčetrtek, Bistrica ob Sotli, Brežice
in Croatia: Đurmanec, Hum na Sutli, Desinić, Zagorska Sela, Klanjec, Kraljevec na Sutli, Brdovec

The hydrological parameters of the Sutla are regularly monitored in Croatia at Zelenjak.

Kozje Park, established in 1981 as Trebče Memorial Park, is located in Slovenian territory west of the Sotla. It is the habitat of over 120 bird species and of about 950 higher plant species.

The earliest known mention of Sutla was in 1028, as Zontla. The name is pre-Slavic in origin and comes from *Sǫtъla. The root  does not have a known meaning.

References

External links

Rivers of Styria (Slovenia)
Rivers of Croatia
International rivers of Europe
Croatia–Slovenia border
Border rivers